James Gray (February 18, 1862 – September 8, 1916) was a journalist and the 19th mayor of Minneapolis.

Life and career
Gray was born in Falkirk, Scotland to John Gray and Elizabeth Ronald. Gray's family emigrated to the United States in 1866, settling in Iowa. He attended schools in Dubuque County, Iowa and Jackson County, Iowa. After working as a teacher for a year, Gray moved to Minneapolis in 1880. He attended the University of Minnesota, graduating as valedictorian in 1885. After graduating, he began working with the Minneapolis Tribune as a reporter. When the Minneapolis Times was founded in 1889, he moved there to work as an editor. He was later promoted to managing editor and also served as a special correspondent in Washington, DC during the run up to the Spanish–American War. Based partially on the name recognition he gained from his work as a correspondent, Gray ran as the Democratic nominee for mayor of Minneapolis in 1898 and won. He ran for re-election in 1900 but was defeated by A. A. Ames. After leaving politics he became an editor with the Minneapolis Journal.

Gray died on September 8, 1916. He is buried in Lakewood Cemetery in Minneapolis.

Electoral history
 Minneapolis Mayoral Election, 1898
 James Gray 16,066
 Edward E. Webster 9,494 
 Albert Alonzo Ames 5,266 
 William J. Dean 923 
 Frank A. Malmquist 599 
 Minneapolis Mayoral Election, 1900
 Albert Alonzo Ames 17,292
 James Gray 12,732 
 William J. Dean 9,140 
 Ole B. Olson 227 
 Asa Kingsbury 217

References

1862 births
1916 deaths
Mayors of Minneapolis
Journalists from Minnesota
University of Minnesota alumni
People from Falkirk
Burials at Lakewood Cemetery
Scottish emigrants to the United States
19th-century American politicians